Isah Adam Muhammad (born 22 April 1987 in Kano) is a Nigerian taekwondo practitioner. At the 2008 Summer Olympics, he reached the quarterfinals of the men's featherweight (-68 kg) competition.  At the 2012 Summer Olympics, he competed in the Men's 68 kg competition, but was defeated in the first round.

References

External links
sports-reference.com

Nigerian male taekwondo practitioners
1987 births
Living people
Olympic taekwondo practitioners of Nigeria
Taekwondo practitioners at the 2008 Summer Olympics
Taekwondo practitioners at the 2012 Summer Olympics
Sportspeople from Kano